The Spencer Amphibian Air Car is an American light amphibious aircraft. The name was first used in 1940 for a prototype air vehicle that developed into the Republic Seabee. The name was later used by its designer Percival Spencer for a series of homebuilt amphibious aircraft roughly based on the Seabee design.

Design and development

Percival H. Spencer formed the Spencer-Larsen Aircraft Corporation and designed the SL-12C amphibian. Disenfranchised with corporate policies in the development of the SL-12C amphibian, Spencer started the Spencer Amphibian Air Car in 1940. The original Spencer Amphibian Air Car was test flown in 1941. The aircraft was put into storage due to restrictions in place in America during World War II. The aircraft and rights to its design were sold to Republic as the "Seabee" in 1943. After leaving Republic, he designed the on-off two-seat Air Car. In 1968, Spencer and retired USAF Col. Dale L. "Andy" Anderson formed a new company to market a four-place amphibious homebuilt design once again called the Spencer Amphibian Air Car, with S-12C, S-12D, S-12E, and S-14 variants. The first example was test flown in 1970 in Chino, California. The unit had a build cost of $8700.00

The S-12-D Aircar is an improved and larger four-seat aircraft, which retains the basic layout of the Seabee. The two seat S-14 used advanced composites and was test flown by Spencer in 1983 at the age of 86. Its design did not meet expectations and the sole example was donated to the EAA AirVenture Museum in Oshkosh, Wisconsin.

The Air Car is built from wood, steel and glass-fibre. It has a strut-braced high wing and the cabin and fuel-carrying floats are similar to the Seabee, but the tail unit is more angular and a retractable tricycle undercarriage is fitted.

In addition to examples constructed by Spencer, plans of the design have been sold for home construction and the first amateur-built Air Car flew in September 1974. Over 50 had flown by 2001. Examples are currently (2009) flying in the US and Canada.

Variants

Spencer Amphibian Air Car  initial two-seat version
S-12-C  early production with  Lycoming
S-12-D  main production version with  Lycoming O-360 or  Lycoming O-540

S-12-E  prototype re-engined with  Continental Tiara 6-285
S-14 Air Car Junior  two-seater, twin booms, Lycoming O-320, one example
Spencer-Larsen SL-12C
Later prototype built in association with the (Victor A) Larsen Aircraft Co, incorporating many design changes, but flight test were unsuccessful and the sole prototype was dismantled after 10 hours flying.

Specifications S-12-E

References

External links

aerofiles
SPENCER AMPHIBIAN AIRPLANE Percival H. Spencer
PERCIVAL HOPKINS SPENCER

1970s United States civil utility aircraft
Homebuilt aircraft
High-wing aircraft
Aircraft first flown in 1941